The Liberation Party (abbreviated PL) is a communist party in Argentina. The party has its roots in the Argentine Socialist Vanguard Party (PSAV). It emerged as the Communist Vanguard (Vanguardia Comunista), evolving into the Marxist–Leninist Communist Party (Partido Comunista Marxista-Leninista) in 1976, before adopting the name PL in 1983. The party publishes Liberación.

After the death of Mao Zedong, the party approved of the changes of political line implemented by Deng Xiaoping.

References

1965 establishments in Argentina
Communist parties in Argentina
Far-left politics in Argentina
Political parties established in 1965